The Maurin Kiribati Party (Protect Kiribati Party) was a political party in Kiribati. 
At the presidential elections of 4 July 2003, its candidate Banuera Berina won 9.1%.

On 29 January 2016, it merged with Teburoro Tito's United Coalition Party to form the Tobwaan Kiribati Party.

References

Defunct political parties in Kiribati
2016 disestablishments in Kiribati
Political parties disestablished in 2016